The Department for Education, Children and Young People (Formally Department of Education) is a government department within the Government of Tasmania with responsibility for primary and secondary education, library and information services, vocational education and training services, children's services, assessment and certification services and youth affairs. The re-named department was established on 1 October 2022.

The department is led by its Secretary, Tim Bullard. The Secretary is responsible to the Minister for Education, presently the Hon. Roger Jaensch MP.

State Library

The headquarters of the State Library of Tasmania is located in Hobart.  The State Library administers and funds all public libraries in Tasmania. There are 7 city/suburban lending libraries and 39 smaller branch libraries located throughout Tasmania.  The State Library also maintains the heritage and reference collections.

School system

The department is responsible for all aspects of education in Tasmania including schooling, Adult Education, the State Library and TAFE Tasmania, a vocational tertiary institution with many campuses around the state.

Schools in the public education system include: 138 primary schools (Kindergarten to Grade 6), 57 high schools (Grade 7 to 10) and 8 colleges (Grade 11 and 12).

Tertiary education

TasTAFE (formerly TAFE Tasmania) is an Australian tertiary body of the Australian state-based Technical and Further Education system. It includes two institutes, the Institute of TasTAFE and the Drysdale Institute.

See also

 Department of Education and Training (Australia)
 List of schools in Tasmania
 List of Tasmanian government agencies
 University of Tasmania

References

External links
Official site

Education
Tasmania
Education in Tasmania